Brose Fahrzeugteile GmbH & Co. KG is an automotive supplier. The family-owned company has its headquarters in Coburg, Germany.

In 2018, the Brose Group developed and produced mechatronic components and systems for vehicle doors, seats and body at 62 locations in 23 countries worldwide. Brose's customers include more than 80 car manufacturers and other automotive suppliers. More than 26,000 employees  worldwide are working for the family-owned company. The Brose Group generated sales of €6.3 billion in fiscal 2018.  The company is also the primary sponsor of and majority owner of Brose Bamberg basketball club.

History

1908–1955
Max Brose opened a trading company for automobile accessories in Berlin on March 4, 1908, while also working as general agent for his father's car body manufacturing company in Wuppertal.

After the First World War, Max Brose and Ernst Jühling, who grew up in Coburg, founded Metallwerk Max Brose & Co. in Coburg on June 14, 1919.

2000–2015
In April 2008, Brose added electric drives for window regulators, sunroofs and  seat belt retractors to its portfolio by purchasing the electric motor business of Continental AG. In setting up the drives business division, the number of employees increased from nearly 10,000 to more than 14,000. Since then, the company has been divided into three business divisions: Seat, Door and Drives.

In 2011 Brose is the world's fifth-largest family-owned automotive supplier based on turnover. 10% of the total annually business volume is invested in the development of new products and processes with a special focus on the development of products that contribute to fuel efficiency.

In April 2013, Brose receives its first Pace Award for the sensor for hands-free opening of liftgates;
Due to the increasing electrification and digitization of vehicles, Brose invests in a test center in Würzburg to measure electromagnetic compatibility.

Awards

2013
 Automotive Innovations Award, Category "Car Body and Exterior" 
 Pace Award for the touch-free liftgate drive 
2012
 BBAC Excellent Supplier Award, Daimler Supplier Award 
2011
 BMW "Supplier Innovation Award" for the touch-free liftgate drive 
2008
 Bavarian Quality Prize 
2007
 Automotive Lean Production Award

Awards for Human Resources Activities
2014
 Focus national survey: Brose is one of Germany's top employers
 Top Employers Automotive 2014: Brose achieved third place in the overall standings

2013
 Career's Best Recruiters Study 2012/2013: Brose second in the industry ranking 
 Universum Student Survey 2013, Brose is "Top climber of the year" 
2012
 Top Employer Automotive 2012/13: Brose among the top 10 
 Innovation Prize of the "Success Factor Family" company competition

Further reading
Gregor Schöllgen: Brose: a German family company 1908–2008. ECON, Berlin 2008. , 9783430200578

References

Auto parts suppliers of Germany
German brands
Companies based in Bavaria
Manufacturing companies established in 1908
1908 establishments in Germany